Janney may refer to:

People
 Allison Janney (born 1959), American actress
 Christopher Janney (born 1950), American interactive sound and light artist
 Craig Janney (born 1967), American retired hockey player
 Edward Janney an American musician, producer and artist
 Ernest Lloyd Janney (1893–1941), Provisional Commander of the Canadian Aviation Corps from 1914 to 1915
 Eli H. Janney (1831–1912), American inventor
 Eli Janney (musician), American record producer and musician
 Frederick Wistar Morris Janney (1919–1979), Central Intelligence Agency officer
 Jack R. Janney (1924–2006), American structural engineer and innovator in the understanding of structural collapses
 John Janney (1798–1872), Virginia politician, president of the American Virginia Secession Convention
 Leon Janney (1917–1980), American actor and radio personality
 Russell Janney (1884–1963), American theatrical producer and novelist
 William Janney (1908–1992), American actor
 Janney Marín Rivera (born 1985), better known as Chiquis Rivera, American singer and television personality

Other uses
 Janney, Indiana, United States, an unincorporated community
 Janney Elementary School, Washington, DC, United States, on the National Register of Historic Places
 Janney (automobile), an American automobile produced by the Janney Motor Company in 1906

See also
 Janney House, Hamilton, Virginia, United States, on the National Register of Historic Places
 Janney coupler, a railroad device invented by Eli H. Janney
 Zoltán Jeney